HP2 or variant, may refer to:

 HP2, a postcode for Hemel Hempstead, see HP postcode area
 hP2, a Pearson symbol
 Harry Potter and the Chamber of Secrets, the second Harry Potter novel
 Harry Potter and the Chamber of Secrets (film), the second Harry Potter film
 Handley Page Type B a.k.a. H.P.2, an airplane
 HP-2, a glider designed by Richard Schreder
 HP2, a type of photographic stock, see Ilford HP
 Haemophilus phage HP2, a virus
 BMW HP2 Enduro, a motorcycle
 BMW HP2 Sport, a motorcycle
 Hp.2 (proceed at reduced speed), from German railway signalling

See also
HP (disambiguation)